Walter Lawrence may refer to:
 Arnold Walter Lawrence, British authority on classical sculpture and architecture
 Walter E. Lawrence, American politician
 Walter Lawrence (Australian politician), member of the New South Wales Legislative Assembly
 Walter Lawrence (cricketer), English cricketer and financier
 Walter Lawrence, Jr., American surgical oncologist
 Walter Roper Lawrence, English author who served in the Indian Civil Service

See also
 Walter Lawrance, priest in the Church of England